In 1882–3 Richard Strauss wrote his Horn Concerto No. 1 in E-flat major, Op. 11, in two versions, one for piano accompaniment and one with an orchestra. (The horn part is the same.) The horn concerto has become the most frequently performed horn concerto written in the 19th century.The premiere with piano accompaniment was given in 1883 at Munich. The premiere with orchestral accompaniment in 1885 at Meiningen. Strauss later wrote a second horn concerto in 1942, towards the end of his life.

The opening theme

Composition history

At the age of 18 whilst a philosophy student at Munich University, having recently completed his Violin Concerto and Cello Sonata, Strauss wrote his first horn concerto. His father Franz Strauss was one of the leading horn players of his day, and the fact that Richard grew up with the sound of the horn in his house led to his exploration of the great potential of the horn as both a solo and orchestral instrument. He had previously written a short piece for the solo horn (Two études for horn TrV 15, 1873), the concerto was the first
orchestral piece he chose to write for the horn.

The version with orchestral accompaniment is entitled "Waldhornkonzert", indicating that the concerto was to be played on the natural valveless horn (Waldhorn), which was the horn of preference played by his father (although Franz also played the valved F horn).  Whilst it is technically possible to play the concerto on an E-flat natural horn, in practice it would be impossible to give a convincing performance.  Alan Jefferson speculates that the title might in fact be a father-son joke.  Strauss's sister Johanna wrote to the British horn player Dennis Brain that she "vividly remembered her father struggling with the solo part, which he found very tiring, even using the high B-flat crook. In particular, he seems to have found the high B-flats too daring and dangerous for performance in the concert hall".

The early public performances would have been made using the valved F single horn, which was indicated in the score in later editions (although the orchestral horns were still specified as E-flat natural horns). In practice, all of the modern performances and recordings are played on the valved F double-horn which was developed at the end of the 19th century. When the concerto was written, the use of natural horns was still common. For example, Brahms continued to write for natural horns in his symphonies (Symphony No. 3 is contemporaneous with the Horn Concerto) because he deemed the sound better. Strauss himself went on to fully exploit the possibilities of the valved horn in his tone poems starting with Don Juan, written just a few years later.

The concerto is in three movements (Allegro, Andante, Allegro) which are played continuously (except very rarely) and lasts about 15–18 minutes.  The composition is typical of Strauss' music at this time in being Romantic in style, showing the influence of Mendelssohn. The orchestral version uses a classical orchestra: 2 flutes, 2 oboes, 2 clarinets, 2 bassoons, 2 horns, 2 trumpets, timpani, and strings.

Premiere

The public premiere with piano was in 1883, shortly after the composition completed with one of Franz Strauss's pupils Bruno Hoyer as soloist. The orchestral version was premiered at Meiningen with Hans von Bülow conducting and the horn part played by the principal horn Gustav Leinhos on 4 March 1885. Strauss wrote to his father that the soloist had "Kolossaler sicherheit" (colossal sureness). Strauss conducted the work at least three times later in his life: Vienna on 7 May 1921, Mannheim on November 3 1929, and Hannover on 9 October 1931.

Recordings

There have been many recordings of this piece.  The first recording was by Dennis Brain in 1947, recorded in Kingsway Hall, London, May 21, 1947 with Alceo Galliera conducting the Philharmonia Orchestra. Those currently available with orchestral accompaniment include:

Recordings with piano accompaniment include:

References
Notes

Sources
Logan Bonathon, The history and practice of performances of Richard Stauss' Concerto No.1 for horn (opus 11.)
Norman Del Mar, Richard Strauss: A critical commentary on his life and works, Volume 1. Faber and Faber, London, second edition 1985 (1961), .
Oscar Franz and Richard Strauss on the Horn in the Late Nineteenth Century, John Ericson, The Arizona State University Horn Studio.
Richard Strauss: The Two Concertos for Horn and Orchestra, Gary A. Greene, Thesis, Butler University, January 1978.

External links

Video of live performance, Stefan Dohr (Horn) with the Auckland Philharmonia Orchestra conducted by Tadaaki Otaka.

Concertos by Richard Strauss
Strauss
1882 compositions
1883 compositions
Compositions in E-flat major